Morphe Cosmetics, also known as Morphe Brushes, legally known as Morphe Holdings (stylized as MORPHE), is a Los Angeles cosmetics and beauty manufacturer founded in 2008. The company specializes in the digital retail direct-to-consumer distribution of beauty and personal care products using partnerships with social media influencers. Morphe has cut ties with multiple partners after many influencers became embroiled in controversy.

In August 2019, Morphe Holdings announced the company had formed new partnership with General Atlantic, who would acquire a majority stake. Additional terms of the deal were not disclosed, however, Morphe's existing shareholders would continue to be investors in the company.

On January 5, 2023 Morphe announced on social media that all stores in the US would close immediately after facing criticism for employee working conditions, and to focus more on  their digital storefront. Seven days later, on January 12, 2023, Morphe filed for bankruptcy.

Authorized retailers of Morphe include Morphe.com, Morphe stores, Ulta.com, Ulta stores, and BDirect Online's Amazon.com store. These authorized retailers are the only to guarantee and authentic Morphe product.

Partnerships 
Morphe partnered with Shane Dawson and Jeffree Star but cut ties in 2020, amid online criticism of the brand after the two became embroiled in a feud between beauty vloggers Tati Westbrook and James Charles and, in Star's case, accusations of racism.

Morphe partnered with Charles in 2017, producing two palettes of eyeshadows, but cut ties in 2021 amid online calls for a boycott after Charles admitted to inappropriately texting two 16-year-old boys when he was 20 or 21. 

Other partnerships include Manny Gutierrez, Nikita Dragun, Jaclyn Hill, Maddie Ziegler, Avani Gregg, Madison Beer, Jackie Aina, Charli D'Amelio, Dixie D'Amelio, and Bretman Rock. In 2020, and 2021, Morphe collaborated with Coca-Cola.

References

Companies based in Los Angeles
Cosmetics companies of the United States
Cosmetics brands
2008 establishments in the United States
Companies that filed for Chapter 11 bankruptcy in 2023
Retail companies disestablished in 2023
2023 disestablishments in California